Ján Chalupka (28 October 1791 - 15 July 1871) was a Slovak dramatist, playwright, publicist and Evangelical pastor.

Life 
He was born in Horná Mičiná, into the family of Evangelical pastor Adam Chalupka, and was not the only member who chose literature: his brother Samo Chalupka was also a writer. Chalupka was educated at home, in Ožďany, Levoča, Prešov, Sárospatak and studied in Vienna and Jena. He was a teacher, from 1817 to 1824 a professor at a lyceum in Kežmarok and from 1824 until his death a pastor in Brezno.

Works 
His main contribution into the Slovak literature was in drama. His activities were the impulse for the theatrical life in present-day Slovakia. He wrote mainly dramatic satirical works, where he criticized local patriotism, Magyarization aspects, conservatism, limited life goals etc. His first works were in Czech and Hungarian, but after 1848 he started writing in Slovak and translated originally Czech works into Slovak.

Drama 
Cycle about Kocúrkovo (comedy, "Gotham City"):
 1830 - Kocourkovo, aneb: Jen abychom v hanbě nezůstali
 1832 - Všecko naopak, aneb: Tesnošilova Anička sa žení a Honzík se vydáva
 1833 - Trasořitka, anebo: Stará láska se předce dočekala
 1835 - Třináctá hodina, aneb: Však se nahledíme, kdo bude hlásníkem v Kocourkově
 1837 - Starouš plesnivec anebo Čtyry svadby na jednom pohřebe v Kocourkově
 1835 - A vén szerelmes, vagy a Tozházi négy völegény
 1854 - Dobrovoľníci
 1862 - Huk a Fuk anebo: Prvý apríl
 1862 - Černokňažník
 1873 - Juvelír

Prose 
 1836 - Kocourkovo (a prosaic version)
 1841 - Bendeguz, Gyula Kolompos und Pista Kurtaforint. Eine Donquixottiade nach der neuesten Mode von P. P.

Other 
 Geschichte der Generalsynoden beider evangelischen Konfessionen in Ungarn vom Jahre 1791 (History of general synods of both Evangelical confessions in Hungary since 1791)
 Schreiben des Grafen Karl Zay, Generalalinspektors der evang. Kirchen und Schulen Augsb. Konf. In Ungarn, an die Prefoessoren zu Leutschau (A letter of Earl Karl Zay, general inspector of evangelical churches and schools of Augsburg confession in Hungary, to professors in Leutschau)
 1842 - Zpěvník evanjelický aneb Písně duchovní staré i nové
 1846–47 - Kázně nedělní a svátečné

External links 
 Ján Chalupka

1791 births
1871 deaths
People from Banská Bystrica District
People from the Kingdom of Hungary
Slovak Lutherans
Slovak dramatists and playwrights
19th-century dramatists and playwrights
19th-century Lutherans